Slow and Easy may refer to:
"Slow and Easy", a song by Zapp & Roger from their album All the Greatest Hits. 
"Slow and Easy", a song by Joe Satriani from his album Engines of Creation
"Slow an' Easy", a song by Whitesnake from their album Slide It In